Serbia competed at the 2013 Mediterranean Games in Mersin, Turkey from the 20th to 30 June 2013. 151 athletes in 22 sports will represent Serbia.

Medalists

Archery

Men

Athletics 

Men
Track & road events

Women
Track & road events

Field events

Badminton 

Men

Women

Basketball

Men's tournament

Team 

Miloš Dimić
Stefan Jović
Nikola Marković
Stefan Živanović
Nikola Kalinić
Filip Čović
Nemanja Arnautović
Đorđe Drenovac
Đorđe Majstorović
Nikola Malešević
Darko Balaban
Stefan Nastić

Standings

Results

Bocce

Uroš Šarac
Veselin Skakić
Srđan Butorac
Nataša Antonjak
Nada Nedeljković
Ivana Sajić

Canoeing

Men

Legend: FA = Qualify to final (medal); FB = Qualify to final B (non-medal)

Women

Legend: FA = Qualify to final (medal); FB = Qualify to final B (non-medal)

Cycling

Fencing

Men

Women

Handball

Men's tournament

Team

Strahinja Milić
Dobrivoje Marković
Nemanja Ilić
Draško Nenadić
Bojan Todorović
Zoran Nikolić
Miloš Dragaš
Luka Mitrović
Nemanja Zelenović
Ljubomir Jošić
Mihailo Radovanović
Mijailo Marsenić
Miljan Pušica
Ilija Abutović
Darko Đukić
Strahinja Stanković

Preliminary round

Women's tournament

Team 

Jovana Bartošić
Ana Kačarević
Jovana Stoiljković
Katarina Krpež
Jovana Risović
Dragana Cvijić
Jelena Živković
Sanja Radosavljević
Jelena Trifunović
Sanja Rajović
Marina Živković
Tamara Georgijev
Katarina Stepanović
Sandra Filipović
Maja Radojičić
Marijana Tanić

Preliminary round

Judo

Men

Women

Karate

Men

Women

Rowing

Men

Women

Sailing

Men

Shooting

Men

Women

Swimming 

Men

Taekwondo

Men

Women

Table tennis

Men

Volleyball

Beach volleyball

Men's Tournament

Women's Tournament

Water Polo

Men's tournament

Team 

Nikola Eškert
Dušan Vasić
Nemanja Matković
Sava Ranđelović
Viktor Rašović
Marko Manojlović
Ognjen Stojanović
Miloš Maksimović
Draško Gogov
Milan Vitorović
Dimitrije Obradović
Đorđe Tanasković
Vojislav Mitrović

Standings

Results

Water skiing

Men

Weightlifting

Wrestling

Men's Freestyle

Men's Greco-Roman

References

External links
 List of sports in which Serbia will participate - Serbian Olympic Committee
 U Mersin s 234 učesnika - Sportski savez Beograda

Nations at the 2013 Mediterranean Games
2013
Mediterranean Games